Konstantin Grcic, born 1965, is a German industrial designer known for creating mass-manufactured items, such as furniture and household products. He has participated in leading design shows and his work can be seen in major museums. Described as having a pared down aesthetic, his functional designs are characterized by geometric shapes and unexpected angles.

Background
Grcic was born in Munich, Germany, in 1965, to a Serbian father from the former Yugoslavia and a German mother, and grew up in Wuppertal.      His father, born in Belgrade, Serbia, was a businessman who collected 18th-century art and his mother an art dealer. As a child, Grcic was surrounded by art  and loved to build things, and during high-school he restored furniture.

Grcic studied cabinetry making in the Arts and Crafts tradition at the John Makepeace School for Craftsmen in Wood in London, starting in 1985. in 1988, he began his graduate studies in Industrial Design at London's Royal College of Art. Grcic worked with British designer Jasper Morrison in the late 1980s until 1990, when he began designing furniture for SCP, one of London's largest design stores. He credits his time in London for helping  develop his individual style, describing "... his experiences in England as stirring his creative potential."

Career

Portfolio
In 1991, Grcic founded his studio, "Konstantin Grcic Industrial Design" (KGID), in Munich, Germany. Working with a staff of five, he creates "... pieces that have been described as both revolutionary and intelligent." According to the New York Times, he has a "... rigorous focus on logic, utility and simplicity".

With an emphasis on usability, Grcic is known for having a spartan approach to design, relying on geometric forms, unusual angles and hard edges. He has created installations and developed products such as furniture, lighting, watches, tableware, espresso makers, and even umbrellas. Grcic became recognized for his 1995 Refolo trolley, 1997 Wanda dish rack, 1998 award-winning Mayday lamp, 1999 ES shelf and 2001 Chaos chair.

His iconic 2004 Chair_One and 2006 Miura stool are both described as being comfortable to sit on, despite their oddly shaped compositions. Grcic has a philosophical approach to design, especially when it comes to seating products, his favourite objects to tackle, "Designing chairs touches issues of society, how we live...How life changes - that’s most interesting.".

He has used cutting edge technology, such as high-tech ceramics and 3D modeling software, to create his mass-produced items. Advanced engineering plastics were the basis of his award-winning Myto Chair, launched at the Milan Furniture Fair in 2008. Grcic also relies on low-tech solutions to advance the design process, manually creating and deconstructing rough paper models. An engineering-oriented approach and extensive research make up his methodology, something attributed to his upbringing, "...his penchant for amassing large amounts of data before he starts to work is nothing if not German." 

His furniture and lighting designs, including the likes of OK pendant light and Noctambule lighting pay testimony to his signature ability to thread the needle between restraint and playfulness.

Exhibits and media
In 2009, the Chicago Art Institute held a retrospective of Grcic's work. Zoë Ryan, who curated the exhibit, states that the designer "is very mindful of how we interact with and use objects". In 2014, a Grcic exhibition of fictional products was showcased at the Vitra Design Museum in Weil am Rhein, Germany. His design pieces are also found in the permanent collections of the MoMA in New York City and the Centre Georges Pompidou in Paris. In 2019, his work was exhibited at Design Miami  and in 2021, it was announced he would collaborate with Cake, a motorbike manufacturer from Sweden.

In 2005, London's Phaidon Press published the first book examining Grcic's body of work. Other publications include monographs accompanying his museum exhibitions. He is also the subject of various design books like "How to Design a Chair", as well as "Chroma: Design, Architecture and Art in Color" where he mentions how the Lego color palette has inspired him. A film about Grcic's developmental process was screened at "A Design Film Festival 2017" held in Singapore.

Related activities

In 2009, Grcic curated an exhibition called "Design Real" at the Serpentine Gallery in London, England. He selected products with a practical function, from well known and lesser known designers, which reflected the first ten years of the millennium. In 2010, he curated two shows, one for France's "St. Etienne Design Biennale" and the other for the Istituto Svizzero (Swiss Institute) in Rome.

Grcic has also participated in design initiatives happening in Belgrade, Serbia, such as speaking at "Belgrade Design Week" or sitting on the juries of the "Mikser Festival" and the "University of Arts in Belgrade" final year competition. Concerning the burgeoning design scene in Serbia's capital city, Grcic has said,"I was not sure what to expect but I encountered a fantastic atmosphere and amazing people." The 2014 retrospective exhibition on Grcic's work, Panorama, held at the Vitra Design Museum, featured the installation Life Stage. Life Stage was a fictitious product meant as a mobile power source made of the eco-friendly resin Acrodur.

Awards and honours
In 2001, Grcic received a "Compasso d’Oro" award for his Mayday lamp. He won another "Compasso d’Oro" in 2011 for his Myto chair. He won two "Designpreis Deutschland" prizes, from the Government of Germany, for his Chair_ONE and Miura stool in 2006 and 2007 respectively. In 2006, his Miura stool also received a "Best of the Best" Red Dot award and an IF Design Award.

In 2010, Grcic was named "Designer of the Year" at Design Miami, where he also created an installation consisting of seating made with polypropylene netting. In 2016, Dezeen magazine listed him as number 14 on their list of top 100 designers, based on the 48 articles written about him. That same year he also received the "Best Designer of the Year" award at the Salone del Mobile in Milan.

In 2014 his Parrish chair for Emeco received the iF Design Award.

References

1965 births
Living people
People from Munich
Serbian designers
Furniture designers
German people of Serbian descent
German industrial designers
Product designers
Compasso d'Oro Award recipients